Montilla Club de Fútbol is a Spanish football team based in Montilla, Córdoba, in the autonomous community of Andalusia.

History
Montilla CF was founded in August 1973, after Club Balompédico Alvear (another club from the city funded by Bodegas Alvear) were ceasing their activities. The club immediately took Alvear's place in the Regional Preferente, and achieved promotion to Tercera División in 1987.

After 13 consecutive seasons in the fourth division, Montilla suffered relegation in 2000, but returned to the category at first attempt. The club would spend the following seasons in the lower leagues, aside from a campaign back in the fourth tier in 2012–13.

Season to season

17 seasons in Tercera División

References

External links
 
Soccerway team profile

1973 establishments in Spain
Association football clubs established in 1973
Football clubs in Andalusia